Pasadena is a neighborhood in southwestern Lexington, Kentucky, United States. Its name is derived from its location just south of Pasadena Drive. All streets in the neighborhood are named after western American cities. Its boundaries are a combination of New Circle Road, Waco Road, and Nakomi Drive to the south, Harrodsburg Road to the west, Pasadena Drive to the north, and a combination of Waco Road and Clays Mill Road to the east.

Neighborhood statistics
 Area: 
 Population: 815
 Population density: 2,953 persons per square mile
 Median household income: $56,351

Public school districts
 Elementary: Clays Mill Elementary School
 Middle: Jessie Clark Middle School
 High: Lafayette High School

External links
 http://www.city-data.com/neighborhood/Pasadena-Lexington-KY.html

Neighborhoods in Lexington, Kentucky